Bataka is a small town in Dominica. It is located in the northeast of the island, between Pagua Bay and Salybia.

References

External links

Indigenous peoples in Dominica
Lands inhabited by indigenous peoples
Populated places in Dominica